Phragmipedium caricinum is a species of orchid occurring from Bolivia to Brazil (Rondônia).

References

External links 

caricinum
Orchids of Brazil
Orchids of Bolivia
Flora of Rondônia